Peter Waage (29 June 1833 – 13 January 1900) was a Norwegian chemist and professor of chemistry at the University of Kristiania. Along with his brother-in-law Cato Maximilian Guldberg, he co-discovered and developed the law of mass action between 1864 and 1879.

Biography
He grew up on the island of Hidra in  Vest-Agder, Norway. He was the son of Peder Pedersen Waage (1796–1872) and Regine Lovise Wathne (1802–72).    He attended the Bergen Cathedral School and studied chemistry and mineralogy at the University of Kristiania (now University of Oslo) under Adolph Strecker. In 1858, he received the Crown Prince's gold medal (Kronprinsens gullmedalje)  for  work on the development of a theory of oxygen-containing acid radicals. He became a cand.real. in 1859. He subsequently  traveled to France and Germany, where he studied for two years including time spent with Robert Bunsen in Heidelberg.

In 1861, Waage was made an  associate professor and in 1866 he was appointed professor of chemistry at the University of Kristiania. He remained a professor at the University  over 30 years. He was also chairman of the Norwegian Polytechnic Society from 1868 to 1869, and the first chairman of the Norwegian branch of the YMCA when it was established in 1880.

Personal life
He was married twice. In 1862, he married  Johanne Christiane Tandberg Riddervold  (1838- 1869), daughter of Hans Riddervold (1795-1876) and Anne Marie Bull (1804-70). Following the death of his first wife, he was married in 1870 with Mathilde Sofie Guldberg (1845-1907), sister of Cato Guldberg.

References

Other sources
Bjørn Pedersen (2007)  Peter Waage kjemiprofessoren fra Hidra(University of Oslo  School Laboratory - Chemistry)

Publications 
 
 - English translation of Waage and Guldberg's 1864 paper (above)

Related reading
Peter Østrøm  Guldberg and Waage on the Influence of Temperature on the Rates of Chemical Reactions (Centaurus. Volume 28, Issue 3. Pages 277–287. October 1985)
Robin E. Ferner and Jeffrey K. Aronson Cato Guldberg and Peter Waage, the history of the Law of Mass Action, and its relevance to clinical pharmacology (Br J Clin Pharmacol. 2016 Jan; 81(1): 52–55)

1833 births
1900 deaths
People from Vest-Agder
People from Flekkefjord
People educated at the Bergen Cathedral School
University of Oslo alumni
Academic staff of the University of Oslo
Norwegian chemists
Norwegian educators
 Recipients of the St. Olav's Medal
YMCA leaders